Fylde Borough Council elections are held every four years. Fylde Borough Council is the local authority for the non-metropolitan district of Fylde in Lancashire, England. Since the last boundary changes in 2003, 51 councillors have been elected from 21 wards. New ward boundaries are due to come into effect for the 2023 elections.

Political control
The first election to the council was held in 1973, initially operating as a shadow authority before coming into its powers on 1 April 1974. Since 1973 political control of the council has been held by the following parties:

Leadership
The leaders of the council since 2010 have been:

Council elections
1973 Fylde Borough Council election
1976 Fylde Borough Council election (New ward boundaries)
1979 Fylde Borough Council election
1983 Fylde Borough Council election
1987 Fylde Borough Council election
1991 Fylde Borough Council election
1995 Fylde Borough Council election
1999 Fylde Borough Council election
2003 Fylde Borough Council election (New ward boundaries increased the number of seats by 2)
2007 Fylde Borough Council election
2011 Fylde Borough Council election
2015 Fylde Borough Council election
2019 Fylde Borough Council election

Election results

Borough result maps

By-election results

1995-1999

1999-2003

2003-2007

2007-2011

References

 By-election results

External links
Fylde Borough Council

 
Local government in the Borough of Fylde
Council elections in Lancashire
Borough of Fylde
District council elections in England